Lim Choong-sil (born 10 January 1996) is a South Korean footballer who plays as a defender.

Career
Lim joined the Seattle Sounders FC Academy in 2014.  On March 29, 2015, he made his professional debut for Seattle Sounders FC 2, a USL affiliate club of Seattle Sounders FC, in a 4–0 victory over Whitecaps FC 2.

References

External links
USSF Development Academy bio

1996 births
Living people
South Korean footballers
South Korean expatriate footballers
Tacoma Defiance players
Association football defenders
Expatriate soccer players in the United States
USL Championship players
Footballers from Seoul